Kinesin family member 15 is a protein that in humans is encoded by the KIF15 gene.

This gene encodes a motor protein that is part of the kinesin superfamily.  KIF15 maintains half spindle separation by opposing forces generated by other motor proteins. KIF15 co-localizes with microtubules and actin filaments in both dividing cells and in postmitotic neurons.

Function 

KIF15 (also known as Kinesin-12 and HKLP2) is a motor protein expressed in all cells during mitosis and in postmitotic neurons undergoing axon growth. KIF15 maintains bipolar microtubule spindle apparatus in dividing cells and shares redundant functions with KIF11. KIF15 is thought to promote spindle assembly by cross-linking and sliding along microtubules creating a separation between centrosomes. The microtubule localization of Kif15 is being regulated by Kinesin binding protein (KBP). HeLa cells depleted of KIF11, with reduced microtubule dynamics, are able to form bipolar spindles from acentrosomal asters in a KIF15 dependent manner. Hence, inhibition of KIF15 function will be a vital therapeutic approach in cancer chemotherapy. Since KIF11 and KIF15 are functionally redundant, drugs targeting both the proteins will be more potent.

Function in neurons 

KIF15 restricts the movement of short microtubules into growing axons by generating forces on microtubules which counteract those generated by cytoplasmic dynein. KIF15, together with KIF23 become enriched in dendrites as neurons mature to promote the transport of minus-end distal microtubules into nascent dendrites.

Interactions 

KIF15 has been shown to interact with TPX2. Both these dimers cooperate to slide along microtubules and maintain bipolar spindles.

References

Further reading

External links